Turritella caelata is a species of sea snail, a marine gastropod mollusk in the family Turritellidae.

Description

Distribution

References

 Ryall P. & Vos C. (2010). Two new species of Turritella (Gastropoda: Turritellidae) from western Africa. Novapex 11(1): 13–20
 Nolf F. & Verstraeten J. (2010) Turritella nzimaorum Ryall & Voss, 2010 a junior synonym of Turritella caelata Mörch in Dunker, 1858. Neptunea 9(2): 28–32

External links

Turritellidae
Gastropods described in 1858